Daniel Mauricio Zamudio Vera (3 August 1987 – 27 March 2012) was a Chilean man whose murder in 2012 became a symbol against homophobic violence in Chile. Zamudio, who identified as gay, was beaten and tortured for several hours in San Borja Park in downtown Santiago on March 2, 2012, by four attackers linked to a neo-Nazi gang. His death and the subsequent media attention helped accelerate legislation against discrimination and opened doors to greater acceptance and tolerance of differences in the conservative country.

In 2013, all four perpetrators were found guilty of first-degree murder and sentenced to prison terms ranging from 7 years to life.

Murder 
Zamudio's parents have stated that he was previously subjected to violence due to his sexual orientation. On March 2, 2012, Zamudio was brutally attacked and beaten for six hours until he lost consciousness. He was taken to the Hospital Emergency Public Assistance in Santiago, where he was diagnosed with traumatic brain injury, a broken leg, and cuts on his stomach that resembled swastikas made with broken bottles. Additionally, cigarette burns were found on various parts of his body. Zamudio died from his injuries 25 days later at the same hospital in Santiago.

Aftermath 

Following Zamudio's death, Chilean President Sebastián Piñera urged parliament to speed up the adoption of a hate crimes law that had been stagnant for over seven years. The law aimed to prohibit discrimination based on "race, ethnicity, religion, sexual orientation, gender, appearance, or disability." However, adoption of the law faced opposition from several churches, who argued that it could lead to the legalization of same-sex marriage. Despite this, the law was passed in July 2012, signed by the President, and entered into force.

Murder trial 
On October 17, 2013, all four men were found guilty of first-degree murder. Judge Juan Carlos Urrutia declared Patricio Ahumada Garay, Alejandro Angulo Tapia, Raúl López Fuentes, and Fabian Mora Mora guilty of a crime of "extreme cruelty" and "total disrespect for human life." On October 28, Ahumada was sentenced to life imprisonment, which was met with cheers from the courtroom. Angulo and López received 15-year sentences, while Mora, the youngest of the group, was sentenced to 7 years due to his cooperation with investigators and lack of prior convictions.

See also 
 LGBT rights in Chile
 LGBT in Chile
 Nazism in Chile
 Films and series based on it:
Zamudio: Lost at Night (2015)
 Jesús (2016)
 You'll Never Be Alone (2016)

References

1987 births
2012 deaths
Violence against gay men
LGBT history in Chile
Neo-Nazism in Chile
March 2012 crimes
2012 murders in Chile
2012 in LGBT history